Evensong is a 1932 novel by the British writer Beverley Nichols. It was inspired by the life of the opera singer Nellie Melba, whom Nichols had known during her later years. The same year Nichols collaborated with Edward Knoblock on a play version which was a major hit in the West End.

Adaptation
In 1934 the story was adapted into a film of the same title by Gainsborough Pictures. Directed by Victor Saville it starred Evelyn Laye in the lead role.

References

Bibliography
 Goble, Alan. The Complete Index to Literary Sources in Film. Walter de Gruyter, 1999.
 Mordden, Ethan. Opera Anecdotes. Oxford University Press, 1985.

1932 British novels
British novels adapted into films
Jonathan Cape books